John Arnold Niggeling (July 10, 1903 – September 16, 1963) was an American professional baseball pitcher who appeared in 184 games in Major League Baseball over all or parts of nine seasons (–) with the Boston Bees / Braves, Cincinnati Reds, St. Louis Browns and Washington Senators.

Born in Remsen, Iowa, Niggeling entered pro baseball in 1928 and promptly won 51 games over his first three minor league seasons. But his major-league debut would have to wait until April 30, 1938, when he was 34 years old. He had two brief National League trials with the 1938 Bees and 1939 Reds, totaling 42 innings pitched, before he was acquired by the Browns in January 1940. In the American League over the next six seasons, Niggeling would exceed 150 innings pitched each year, win 56 games, and place in the Junior Circuit's top ten pitchers in earned run average three times (–), and strikeouts twice (1942 and 1944).

He won a career-high 15 games with the Browns in 1942 before joining the wartime Senators, who in both 1944 and  fielded a starting rotation featuring four knuckleballers (Mickey Haefner, Dutch Leonard and Roger Wolff were the others). Niggeling's career won–lost record was 64–69 with a 3.22 ERA. In his 184 MLB games, 161 as a starting pitcher, he allowed 1,111 hits and 516 bases on balls, with 620 strikeouts, in 1,250 innings of work; he was credited with 81 complete games and 12 shutouts. He retired from pro ball in 1947.

In later years, Niggeling worked as a barber in Le Mars, Iowa.

Niggeling died at age 60 in LeMars, having committed suicide by hanging himself in his hotel room. He had been suffering from back pain the last few years of his life and was recently divorced from his wife.

See also

List of knuckleball pitchers

References

External links 

1903 births
1963 suicides
Barbers
Baseball players from Iowa
Boston Bees players
Boston Braves players
Cincinnati Reds players
Des Moines Demons players
Evansville Hubs players
Indianapolis Indians players
Kansas City Blues (baseball) players
Knuckleball pitchers
Major League Baseball pitchers
Nashville Vols players
Newark Bears (IL) players
Oklahoma City Indians players
People from Le Mars, Iowa
St. Louis Browns players
Sioux City Soos players
Suicides by hanging in Iowa
Washington Senators (1901–1960) players
Waterloo Hawks (baseball) players
Wilkes-Barre Barons players
1963 deaths